Josef Grumser (10 February 1934 – 10 January 2017) was an Austrian boxer. He competed in the men's lightweight event at the 1960 Summer Olympics.

References

1934 births
2017 deaths
Austrian male boxers
Olympic boxers of Austria
Boxers at the 1960 Summer Olympics
Lightweight boxers
20th-century Austrian people